John O'Hare is an Australian actor, director and teacher from Sydney, Australia. He works in film, television and theatrical productions and was the Head of Acting at QUT Creative Industries Brisbane in 2000 to 2003 https://www.qut.edu.au/courses/bachelor-of-fine-arts-acting
Then was appointed the Artistic Director and Head of Acting at the Actors College of Theatre and Television and Academy of Film Theatre and Televisionin Sydney.
O'Hare is also the co-founder and co artistic director of O'Punksky's Theatre Company.

Early life and education
O'Hare was born in Moston, Manchester in the UK on 14 October 1962 Migrated to Australia in December 1969 educated at Balcatta Senior High School, Perth (1976), the Western Australian Academy of Performing Arts (1988) and then the Queensland University of Technology (2000).

References

External links
 (On 27-03-2021 links to a Chinese lottery center)

Opunksky's Theatre

English emigrants to Australia
Male actors from Sydney
1962 births
Living people